Amorphoscelis rufula is a species of praying mantis native to Borneo.

See also
List of mantis genera and species

References

Amorphoscelis
Endemic fauna of Borneo
Insects described in 1933